is a Japanese actor. He co-starred with Sayuri Yoshinaga in many Nikkatsu films. In 1960, Hamada joined Nikkatsu Company. He won his first major award at the Elan d'or Awards in 1961. In 1966, Hamada was involved in the quarrel at the bar in Nagoya and came close to losing an eye. The incident hindered his acting career.

Hamada appeared in the Tokusatsu superhero series Ultraman Gaia in 1999.

Selected filmography

Film
 Foundry Town (1962) : Tsukamoto Katsumi
 Bad Girl (1963)
 Dorodarake no Junjō (1963)
 Utsukushi Jyudai (1964)
 Gazing at Love and Death (1964)
 Izu no Odoriko (1963)
 Outlaw: Gangster VIP (1968) : Tsujikawa Takeo
 Daikanbu Nagurikomi (1969)
 Fuji sanchō (1970) : Sokkō
 Sandakan No. 8 (1974) : Satō
 Karafuto 1945 Summer Hyosetsu no Mon (1974) : Kiyoharu Nakanishi
 KochiKame: Tokyo Beat Cops (1977) as Goro Totsuka
 Inubue (1978)
 Tempyō no Iraka (1980) : Genrō
 A Litre of Tears (2005) 
 Enkiri Village: Dead End Survival (2011) : Hongō

Television
Taiga drama
Ten to Chi to (1969) : Hashiba Hideyoshi
Tokugawa Ieyasu (1983) : Ukita Hideie
Nantatte 18 sai! (1972–73) : Ryūji Minagawa
Iron King (1972–73) : Goro Kirishima
Ultraman Gaia (1999) : Kōsuke Ranbashi

References

20th-century Japanese male actors
1943 births
Living people